The John S. Honeyman House is a house located in the West End area of downtown Portland, Oregon, listed on the National Register of Historic Places.

See also
 National Register of Historic Places listings in Southwest Portland, Oregon

References

1879 establishments in Oregon
Houses completed in 1879
Houses on the National Register of Historic Places in Portland, Oregon
Italianate architecture in Oregon
Southwest Portland, Oregon
Portland Historic Landmarks